Do Mastane is a 1958 Hindi film directed by Harish Tara. It stars Geeta Bali, Motilal, Nigar Sultana, Begum Para, Sheikh Mukhtar, Johnny Walker, N. A. Ansari, Murad, Tun Tun and Sapru. It has music by Hemant Kumar and lyrics written by S.H. Bihari, Indeevar, Kaif Irfani, Anjum Jaipuri and Balkrishna Sharma Madhup.

Cast

 Geeta Bali
 Motilal
 Nigar Sultana
 Begum Para
 Sheikh Mukhtar
 Johnny Walker
 N. A. Ansari
 Murad
 Tun Tun
 Sapru

Soundtrack

References

External links

1958 films
1950s Hindi-language films
Films scored by Hemant Kumar